The Green Bay Packers Hall of Fame was the first hall of fame built to honor a single professional American football team. John P. Holloway, a Brown County administrator and arena director, and William L. Brault, a Green Bay restaurateur and Packers fan, co-founded the Packer Hall of Fame museum in 1966. According to them, they got the idea after visitors to Green Bay would repeatedly ask about the Packers' storied history. Sensing opportunity, they went to Packers head coach Vince Lombardi, suggesting a Hall of Fame should be made to attract and educate tourists about the Packers and their history. Lombardi gave them his approval, and according to Brault, as he left his office, Lombardi called out to him, "Don't screw it up!"

Holloway also founded the Green Bay Area Visitor and Convention Bureau in 1964 from which the original hall of fame began. The hall opened as a series of exhibits displayed in the lower concourse of the Brown County Veterans Memorial Arena, although it was not a permanent residence, as the exhibits had to be removed each autumn to make room for the Green Bay Bobcats hockey team, which played its home games at the Arena. In 1967, the Packer Hall of Fame Association, a separate corporate entity from the team, was founded and annual induction banquets were subsequently launched in 1970. The Hall did not become a permanent site until 1976 when its new home, an addition to the Brown County Veterans Arena, was formally dedicated on April 3, 1976, by President Gerald R. Ford. Outside of the Hall of Fame was a 'Receiver Statue' that was dedicated to the invention of the Forward Pass.

Over the next 26 years, the Green Bay Packers Hall of Fame encountered many expansions and renovations. In 2003, renovations to Lambeau Field provided a new home within the new Lambeau Field Atrium for the Hall. Packers legends Bart Starr and Ron Wolf rededicated the Hall on September 4, 2003. The Hall contains a vast array of Packers memorabilia, a re-creation of Vince Lombardi's office, plaques representing each of the inductees and the Lombardi trophies from Green Bay's four Super Bowl wins. As of 2022, the Packers Hall of Fame has inducted 166 people, 29 of whom have been inducted into the Pro Football Hall of Fame.

Inductees

Footnotes

Atkinson was a businessman who, in 1950, helped lead a stock drive that helped keep the Packers financially stable.  He also served on the Green Bay Packers Board of Directors from 1950 to 1985.
Biever has been the team photographer since 1946, having taken an estimated 150,000 photos over his career.
Brault founded the Green Bay Packers Hall of Fame in 1967, expanded it to its current location in 1976, and served as the Executive Director of the Hall of Fame from 1970 to 1994.
Brusky was a general practitioner who coordinated the teams medical care.
Burke was the Band Director for the Packers, arranging the pre-game and half-time shows, while also leading the official Green Bay Packers band.
Calhoun is credited with being the promoter of the Green Bay Packers during its early years.  He was the secretary of the Packers, created the Dope Sheet, helped collect money in his hat during football games, and named the team the "Packers."
Clifford was the original Green Bay Football Club as a non-profit organization in 1923 and was the club's attorney from 1922 to 1952.
Cochran was the offensive backfield coach under Vince Lombardi and Dan Devine, while also serving as a scout from 1975 to 2004.
Daley was a journalist for the Green Bay Packers Press-Gazette who covered the Packers for more than 35 years.
Harlan started out as the Packers Assistant General Manager, serving in that role from 1971 to 1989.  In 1990, he was elected as the President, leading the team to 13 consecutive winning seasons. Harlan is Chairman Emeritus of the Green Bay Packers.
Irwin worked for the Packers flagship radio station, broadcasting Packers games for 30 years.
Joannes was the team's first security and was elected president of the Packers in 1930, serving in that role until 1947.
From 1924 to 1940, Jorgensen served as the Packers equipment manager.  After the death of Dave Woodard, he became the Packers trainer, serving that role until 1970.  The 47 seasons of service is the longest continuous service by an employee of the Packers.
Kelly was the team physician, Packer's President in 1929, and an executive committee member for 28 years.

Leicht was a Packers Executive Committee Member for 24 years, the Board of Director for 42 years and was a key player in the building of City Stadium and Lambeau Field.
Miller was originally a player for the Packers, and came back to the organization as the Directory of Publicity and Sales Promotion.  He later became an Assistant General Manager and finally became an Assistant to the President, finally retiring in 1988.
Olejniczak started out on the Packers Executive Committee, and was credited with helping to build City Stadium and hiring Vince Lombardi.  In 1982, he became the first Chairman of the Board for the Packers.
Parins was the Packers President from 1982 to 1989, helping to improve and expand the Green Bay Packers facilities.
Remmel started out his career as a sports reporter, having worked with every head coach of the Packers in the team's history.  Remmel joined the Packers organization as director of public relations from 1974–2004, and served as the team historian until 2007.
Schneider was the chair of the Green Bay Chamber of Commerce Sports Committee, a supporter of the Packers, and helped establish the Packers Hall of Fame.
Scott was the Packers TV broadcaster for the Packers, having called the championships teams of the 1960s.
Treml worked as the first video director for the Packers, in charge of editing game and practice video.
Trowbridge was the Green Bay Packers legal council, treasurer, and part of the Packers Executive Committee.
Turnbull was the Packers first President, helping to support the then small team.  Turnbull was also part of The Hungry Five.
Vainisi was a talent scout for the Packers who was credited with setting up intricate information gathering systems on players and also scouting many of the future stars of the "Lombardi Era."
Wolf was the Packers Executive Vice President and General Manager.  He is credited with bringing the Packers back to its winning ways.  Wolf signed Mike Holmgren and traded for Brett Favre, a combination that led to many successful seasons.
Fischer was a key contributor to the club's success and helped guide the team through several critical periods, including the NFL absorption of teams from the All-America Football Conference, Curly Lambeau's resignation in 1950 and the important stock sale that same year.
As of January 22, 2013, Gbaja-Biamila was the Packers all-time leader in career sacks with 74.5. He was surpassed on September 28, 2017 by Clay Matthews III.

See also
Green Bay Packers Fan Hall of Fame
Wisconsin Athletic Walk of Fame

References
General

Specific

 
American football museums and halls of fame
Halls of fame in Wisconsin
Hall of Fame